Heptapleurum ellipticum, commonly known in Australia as the climbing umbrella tree, is a plant in the family Araliaceae native to the Indian subcontinent, Indochina, Malesia, Papuasia and Australia.

References

External links
 
 
 View a map of historical sightings of this species at the Australasian Virtual Herbarium
 View observations of this species on iNaturalist
 View images of this species on Flickriver

ellipticum
Taxa named by Berthold Carl Seemann
Plants described in 1865
Flora of India
Flora of Indo-China
Flora of Malesia
Flora of Papuasia
Flora of Queensland